The 2013 World Sambo Championships was held in Saint Petersburg, Russia between the 21 and 25 November 2013. This tournament included competition in both Sambo, and Combat Sambo.

Medal overview

Combat Sambo Events

Men's Sambo Events

Women's events

Medal table

References

External links 
http://www.eurosambo.com/en/competitions/2013/94/

World Sambo Championships
World Sambo Championships, 2006
Sports competitions in Saint Petersburg
2013 in sambo (martial art)